The normalized difference red edge index (NDRE) is a metric that can be used to analyse whether images obtained from multi-spectral image sensors contain healthy vegetation or not. It is similar to Normalized Difference Vegetation Index (NDVI) but uses the ratio of Near-Infrared and the edge of Red as follows:

The red edge is the part of the spectrum centred around 715 nm.

References

External links
 Chlorophyll Absorption
Spectral Reflectance Changes Associated with Autumn Senescence of Aesculus hippocastanum L. and Acer platanoides L. Leaves. Spectral Features and Relation to Chlorophyll Estimation

Satellite meteorology
Remote sensing
Biogeography